The Mycerobas grosbeaks are a genus of finch in the family Fringillidae. They are colorful and are at 20–23 cm the largest species in the family. They are found in the southern Himalayas and across into China.
The genus contains the following four species:

References

 
Bird genera
 
Taxonomy articles created by Polbot